Rebecca Mitchell may refer to:
Rebecca Mitchell (character), Tamzin Outhwaite's character in Hotel Babylon
Rebecca Mitchell (epidemiologist), American epidemiologist and member of the Georgia House of Representatives